Davenport is a census-designated place (CDP) in Santa Cruz County, California. The 2020 United States census reported Davenport's population was 388.

Situation
Davenport lies along the coast of the Pacific Ocean, situated about 9 miles north of Santa Cruz, on Highway One. Originally on the banks of San Vicente Creek, the town expanded to the north during the twentieth century.

The town is presently noted for the spectacular cliffs and bluffs above the Pacific, beaches in between cliffs, surfing opportunities, the cement plant run by Cemex (shuttered in January 2010), and the former headquarters of Odwalla, a company that makes fruit juices.

History

Davenport built a 400-foot wharf at the mouth of Agua Puerca Creek ("agua puerca" translates to "muddy water"). This wharf was built to load the lumber brought down from the hills for shipment to Santa Cruz. A small village grew up around the port and was known as Davenport Landing. The local post office began operations in 1874, but was known only as Davenport. Agua Puerca Creek lived up to its name by bringing down so much mud that the port filled up and steamers could not tie up to the wharf to load lumber. A small extension did not solve the problem. Then a competitor built a longer wharf, but it was destroyed in a storm. Captain Davenport went bankrupt and moved to Santa Cruz. The post office in Davenport Landing closed in 1889.

When Captain Davenport went bankrupt, his assets were auctioned off to pay creditors. Among the items auctioned off were whaling items leading to speculation that he carried out whaling activities from the port, especially after he started losing money. However, no eyewitness reports of whaling activities at Davenport Landing have been found.

In 1905, an east coast businessman named William Dingee bought the Santa Cruz Lime Company, which had a lime quarry on the banks of San Vicente Creek, south of Davenport Landing. In the following year, the Santa Cruz Portland Cement Company manufacturing plant was built nearby. At that time, the closed Davenport Landing post office opened up in the settlement that grew up around the cement plant. It again only used the name of Davenport; hence, the name of the town.

Davenport has three restaurants, two art galleries, a store, a post office, the Davenport Cash Store, and Pacific School, the only school in the Pacific Elementary School District.

The ZIP Code is 95017 and the community is inside area code 831.

Points of interest

American Abalone
Davenport is home to American Abalone, which produces farm-raised California red abalone. No tours are offered.  California farm-raised abalone has been selected by the Monterey Bay Aquarium's Sea Watch program as an excellent choice for environmentally conscious seafood consumers. 

Cement Plant and CEMEX Redwoods
The cement plant was built in 1906 and operated as the Santa Cruz Portland Cement Company. In subsequent years, it was operated by Pacific Cement and Aggregates (1956), Lone Star Cement Corporation (1965), and RMC Pacific Materials (1998).  In 2005, the plant was acquired by Mexico's CEMEX corporation. That same year, the plant was reported to have emitted 100 pounds of mercury. The presence of high levels of chromium-6, purported to be a cancer-causing chemical, led to strained relationships between CEMEX, the Environmental Protection Agency, and County of Santa Cruz. 
CEMEX ceased operations and decommissioned the plant in 2010. The 8500-acre parcel is now referred to as the CEMEX Redwoods and is planned for future park use. According to the Palo Alto-based Peninsula Open Space Trust, the CEMEX Redwoods have been renamed the San Vicente Redwoods

Davenport Jail

Of historical interest is the Davenport Jail. It has two cells, and was used only twice from the time of its construction in 1914 until its decommissioning in 1936. Today it is a museum featuring coastal history supported by volunteers from the Santa Cruz Museum of Art and History.

Saint Vincent DePaul Church
St. Vincent DePaul Church, in Davenport, was built entirely of cement from the local cement factory in 1914. The Church is the subject of a famous photograph by Ansel Adams.

Southern Pacific Freight Line
The southern portion of the Ocean Shore Railroad operated between Davenport and Santa Cruz from 1907 to 1920.  The Southern Pacific freight line between the two communities is still in place.

Geography

According to the United States Census Bureau, the CDP covers an area of 2.8 square miles (7.4 km2), 99.63% of it land and 0.37% of it water.

Climate
Davenport has mild weather throughout the year, enjoying a Mediterranean climate (Köppen Csb) characterized by cool, wet winters and warm, mostly dry summers.  Due to its proximity to Monterey Bay, fog and low overcast are common during the night and morning hours, especially in the summer.

Demographics

The 2010 United States Census reported that Davenport had a population of 408. The racial makeup of Davenport was 272 (66.7%) White, 6 (1.5%) African American, 5 (1.2%) Native American, 12 (2.9%) Asian, 82 (20.1%) from other races, and 31 (7.6%) from two or more races. Hispanic or Latino of any race were 172 persons (42.2%).

The Census reported that 349 people (85.5% of the population) lived in households, 59 (14.5%) lived in non-institutionalized group quarters, and 0 (0%) were institutionalized.

There were 123 households, out of which 36 (29.3%) had children under the age of 18 living in them, 51 (41.5%) were opposite-sex married couples living together, 16 (13.0%) had a female householder with no husband present, 11 (8.9%) had a male householder with no wife present.  There were 15 (12.2%) unmarried opposite-sex partnerships, and 3 (2.4%) same-sex married couples or partnerships. 30 households (24.4%) were made up of individuals, and 13 (10.6%) had someone living alone who was 65 years of age or older. The average household size was 2.84.  There were 78 families (63.4% of all households); the average family size was 3.36.

The population was spread out, with 79 people (19.4%) under the age of 18, 41 people (10.0%) aged 18 to 24, 115 people (28.2%) aged 25 to 44, 132 people (32.4%) aged 45 to 64, and 41 people (10.0%) who were 65 years of age or older.  The median age was 40.3 years. For every 100 females, there were 137.2 males.  For every 100 females age 18 and over, there were 141.9 males.

The homeowner vacancy rate was 1.4%; the rental vacancy rate was 1.8%. 49.5% of the population lived in owner-occupied housing units and 36.0% lived in rental housing units.

Notable people
 Joe Brovia, professional baseball player
 Olga Najera-Ramirez, anthropologist
 Marcel Soros, professional  surfer

See also
 Davenport oral history, (videorecording, series), Community Action Board, (Santa Cruz: Community Television of Santa Cruz County, 1998).
 Awaswas language
 Davenport tide pools
 List of birds of Santa Cruz County, California
 Rancho Agua Puerca y las Trancas, nearby Spanish land grant

References

External links

 Santa Cruz County Conference & Visitors Council - Davenport Visitor Information
 USGS images

Census-designated places in Santa Cruz County, California
Census-designated places in California
Populated coastal places in California